Kevin Danso (born 19 September 1998) is an Austrian professional footballer who plays as a centre-back for Ligue 1 club Lens and the Austria national team.

Formerly a youth international at various levels from under-15 to under-21, he made his debut for the Austria national team.

Early life
Danso was born in Austria to Ghanaian parents before moving to Milton Keynes in England at the age of six.

Club career

Early years
Danso joined the academy of Milton Keynes Dons at under 9 level having previously been a striker in the Reading academy, staying at the club until 2014 before moving to FC Augsburg in Germany.

FC Augsburg
On 3 March 2017, Danso made his Bundesliga debut for FC Augsburg at the age of 18 years and 165 days old, becoming the youngest player to make a league appearance in the club's history. A week later, he signed a new four-year contract with the club.

Southampton loan
On 9 August 2019, the day after the Premier League transfer window closed, it was announced that Danso signed for Southampton on a one-year loan, with the option to buy at the end of the 2019–20 season.

Fortuna Düsseldorf loan
On 18 August 2020 he went to Fortuna Düsseldorf on loan. He left Fortuna upon the expiration of his contract on 24 May 2021.

Lens
On 6 August 2021, Danso joined Ligue 1 side RC Lens. On 19 March 2022, he scored his first goal with Lens against Clermont.

International career
Danso was eligible to represent England, Ghana, or Austria internationally. He represented Austria's U15, U16, U17, Austria U18, and U19 youth teams.

In May 2017, he received his first call-up to the senior national team.

Career statistics

Club

International

References

External links

 
 

1998 births
Living people
People from Voitsberg
Austrian people of Ghanaian descent
Austrian emigrants to England
Footballers from Styria
Austrian footballers
Association football midfielders
Austria international footballers
Austria youth international footballers
Bundesliga players
Premier League players
2. Bundesliga players
Regionalliga players
Ligue 1 players
Reading F.C. players
Milton Keynes Dons F.C. players
FC Augsburg players
FC Augsburg II players
Southampton F.C. players
Fortuna Düsseldorf players
RC Lens players
Austrian expatriate footballers
Austrian expatriate sportspeople in Germany
Expatriate footballers in Germany
Austrian expatriate sportspeople in France
Expatriate footballers in France